Gabrielle Elizabeth Kelly is an Irish statistician. She is currently a professor of statistics at University College Dublin, and the former president of the Irish Statistical Association.

Her research has included studies of the correlation between birth and death dates, and on correlations between student attendance at university lectures and the time of day of the lecture.

Education and career
Kelly earned her bachelor's and master's degrees at University College Cork, and completed a Ph.D. in statistics at Stanford University in 1981. Her dissertation, The Influence Function in the Errors in Variables Problem, was supervised by Rupert G. Miller Jr.

She became a lecturer at University College Cork after completing her doctorate, moved to the department of biostatistics at Columbia University in 1985, moved again to the University College & Middlesex School of Medicine in 1987, and took her present position as professor at University College Dublin in 1990.

Recognition and service
Kelly was the president of the Irish Statistical Association from 2016 to 2018.

References

External links

Year of birth missing (living people)
Living people
Irish statisticians
Women statisticians
Alumni of University College Cork
Stanford University alumni
Academics of University College Cork
Columbia University faculty
Academics of University College Dublin